The Ranong bent-toed gecko (Cyrtodactylus ranongensis) is a species of gecko that is endemic to southern Thailand.

References 

Cyrtodactylus
Reptiles described in 2015
Taxa named by Kirati Kunya